The Arrow Lakes in British Columbia, Canada, divided into Upper Arrow Lake and Lower Arrow Lake, are widenings of the Columbia River. The lakes are situated between the Selkirk Mountains to the east and the Monashee Mountains to the west. Beachland is fairly rare, and is interspersed with rocky headlands and steep cliffs. Mountain sides are heavily forested, and rise sharply to elevations around 2,600 metres.

Originally two lakes 14 miles apart, the Arrow Lakes became one 230 km long lake due to the reservoir created by the 1960s construction of the Keenleyside Dam; at low water the two lakes remain distinct, connected by a fast-moving section known as the Narrows. Damming the Lower Arrow Lake resulted in water rising 12 metres above natural levels. As a result of higher water, the valley lost 2/3 of its arable land. Approximately two thousand people were relocated. The lake stretches from just north of Castlegar in the south to Revelstoke in the north.  Another hydroelectric development Whatshan Dam, diverted Whatshan Lake from the Whatshan River directly into the Arrow Lakes, just north of the Needles-Fauquier Ferry.

The Arrow Lakes are part of the traditional territory claims of the Sinixt, Okanagan and Ktunaxa peoples, though at the time of contact and during colonization only Sinixt lived along its shores.

Crossings
There are three ferries:
 Upper Arrow Lake Ferry between Shelter Bay and Galena Bay at the northern end of Upper Arrow Lake.
 Needles Cable Ferry further south, on BC Hwy 6 between Nakusp and Vernon.
 Arrow Park Ferry, a cable ferry connecting East Arrow Park and West Arrow Park about 28 km south of Nakusp.

The nearest bridges are upstream of the lakes at Revelstoke and downstream of the lakes at Castlegar.

Name origin

The name Arrow Lakes, though in wide use, is unofficial; the gazetted names are for Upper Arrow Lake and Lower Arrow Lake, and BC Hydro refers to them together as the Arrow Lakes Reservoir.  The origin of the name was a cultural feature known as Arrow Rock on the east shore of Lower Arrow Lake, about 35 km upstream from Castlegar, opposite the community of Renata, a large rock outcrop or overhang above the water, in the face of which was a hole filled with arrows.  Different stories surround the meaning of the arrows, said to be shot there by the Lakes people (Sinixt) for good luck, either before or after war:On October 19, 1826, while travelling south between Upper and Lower Arrow Lakes, Simpson passed "...The Arrow Rock, so named on account of a round hole in the face full of Arrows, said to have been fired at it by the Indians when practicing the Bow and Arrow before a war excursion." (Journal of Emilius Simpson; HBC Archives' accession B223/a/3 1826 Folio 39D-41) Source: included with note

In the days before Columbus was born, the 'Indians' of the west and east Kootenay were at continual strife. It was customary for the west Kootenay Indians to winter along the southern Columbia and to ascend the stream every summer, to the lakes where hunting was good. As the tribes in the Slocan were always on the alert for war, they had their scouts out on the Arrow Lakes to note when their enemies came up the river. One summer the scouts returned from the [Arrow] Lakes with news that a particularly large force of warriors were going up the river. So the Slocan tribes prepared for war and crossed the mountains in force to Nakusp. On embarking from their canoes at Nakusp (the bay behind the long point) they noticed signs of a great storm having passed. On proceeding up the lake for some distance they came upon the force of the enemy. But alas ! There were none to resist them, for the great storm had apparently come suddenly upon them and there was nothing left but a heaving mass of canoe wreckage and dead bodies. The Slocan Indians took this as a great favour from the great 'Manatoo', and in token of respect they fired all their arrows at the high rock off which they lay, and wrote inscriptions on the face of the rock. Because of the vast wealth of arrow heads that fell to the bottom of the lake that day, the Indians named it Arrow Lake. (Relayed by Richard Blyth, as told to him by Chief Louis Joseph, Burton.) Source: BC place name cards, or correspondence to/from BC's Chief Geographer or BC Geographical Names Office.

Gallery

See also 
 British Columbia Ferries
Nakusp, British Columbia
Steamboats of the Arrow Lakes

References

Further reading 

 Parr, Joy (2010). Sensing Changes: Technologies, Environments, and the Everyday, 1953-2003, UBC Press.

 
Columbia River
Reservoirs in British Columbia
Lakes of British Columbia
Columbia Country
Lake groups of Canada
Kootenay Land District